Cambarus loughmani, the blue Teays mudbug, is a species of burrowing crayfish endemic to the pre-glacial Teays River Valley in West Virginia. The species was previously considered to be part of the Cambarus dubius complex.

References

Cambaridae
Freshwater crustaceans of North America
Crustaceans described in 2018
Endemic fauna of West Virginia
Taxobox binomials not recognized by IUCN